Túlio Lustosa Seixas Pinheiro or simply Túlio (born April 25, 1976 in Brasília, Brazil), is a retired Brazilian defensive midfielder.

Club statistics

Honours
Goiás State League: 1996, 1997, 1998, 1999, 2000, 2003
Brazilian Center-West Cup: 2000
Rio de Janeiro's Cup: 2007

Contract
1 January 2008 to 31 December 2010

External links

 sambafoot.com
 CBF

1976 births
Living people
Brazilian footballers
Brazilian expatriate footballers
Goiás Esporte Clube players
Botafogo de Futebol e Regatas players
Sport Club Corinthians Paulista players
Figueirense FC players
Grêmio Foot-Ball Porto Alegrense players
Oita Trinita players
Al Hilal SFC players
Expatriate footballers in Japan
Expatriate footballers in Saudi Arabia
Campeonato Brasileiro Série A players
Campeonato Brasileiro Série B players
J1 League players
Association football midfielders
Footballers from Brasília